Mexican cinematographer Emmanuel Lubezki has won 109 awards from 147 nominations. He has won three Academy Awards, four British Academy Film Awards, and four Critics' Choice Movie Awards, among various other accolades.

Lubezki received recognition early in his career, earning two Ariel Award nominations for Best Cinematography at the 1992 ceremony for Sólo con tu pareja (his first film with director Alfonso Cuarón) and Like Water for Chocolate, winning for the latter. Lubezki won the award twice more consecutively; in 1993 for Miroslava, and in 1994 for Ámbar. Two years later, he was nominated for his first Academy Award for Best Cinematography for A Little Princess (1995), which he again shot for Cuarón, at the 68th Academy Awards. His cinematography for Tim Burton's Sleepy Hollow (1999) received significant awards attention, winning him a Satellite Award for Best Cinematography and a Boston Society of Film Critics Award for Best Cinematography and earning Lubezki his second Academy Award nomination along with six other nominations from various organizations.

The New World (2005), Lubezki's first collaboration with director Terrence Malick, marked his third Academy Award nomination and earned him five nominations and three awards. He received significant awards attention for his work on Cuarón's Children of Men (2006), being awarded nine wins and four nominations, including a fourth Academy Award nomination. In 2011, he re-teamed with Malick for The Tree of Life, which was his fifth film nominated for an Academy Award; his cinematography was awarded by 22 other award shows and organizations. He received international awards attention for his next three films; Gravity (2013), Birdman (2014), and The Revenant (2015), including three consecutive Academy Awards at the 86th, 87th, and 88th Academy Awards. , he is the only cinematographer to achieve this.

Awards and nominations

Footnotes

References 

Lubezki, Emmanuel